Capnolymma ohbayashii is a species of beetle in the family Cerambycidae. It was described by Holzschuh in 2006.

References

Beetles described in 2006
Lepturinae